Mexico competed at the 2019 World Aquatics Championships in Gwangju, South Korea from 12 to 28 July.

Medalists

Artistic swimming

Mexico entered 10 artistic swimmers.

Women

 Legend: (R) = Reserve Athlete

Diving

Mexico entered 16 divers.

Men

Women

Mixed

High diving

Mexico qualified three male and one female high divers.

Men

Women

Open water swimming

Mexico qualified three male and three female open water swimmers.

Men

Women

Mixed

Swimming

Mexico has entered four swimmers.

Men

Women

Mixed

References

World Aquatics Championships
2019
Nations at the 2019 World Aquatics Championships